The Beer Drinkers and Hell Raisers Tour was a concert tour through North America and Europe, undertaken by American rock band ZZ Top. Arranged in support of their 2003 album Mescalero, the band visited arenas, amphitheaters, and festivals from 2003 to 2004. To match the artistic theme that the group created with Mescalero, the tour was intended to differ from their past and surpass expectations of the band. Contrary to ZZ Top's elaborately staged multimedia events from previous tours, the Beer Drinkers and Hell Raisers Tour was a modest stage setup. It utilized minimalism by adorning "Mescalero" themed props on its stage. To escape their reputation for using stage gimmicks, ZZ Top embodied a more staid and focused image on tour. The Beer Drinkers and Hell Raisers Tour was central to Mescalero′s success.

The tour's concept was inspired by resemblances of Mexico and the American Southwest. The stage featured a plaster model of a cantina doorway that was decorated with glitter and neon finish. Day of the Dead skeletons, sombreros and a toast were incorporated into the shows. On stage, both Billy Gibbons and Dusty Hill donned several costumes they designed, including rhinestone-embellished serapes, jackets, and oversized cowboy hats. In contrast to other ZZ Top tours, each of the Beer Drinkers and Hell Raisers shows opened with four to ten consecutive older songs before newer material was played.

Consisting of five legs and 137 shows, the tour began in Bossier City, Louisiana on April 25, 2003 and ended in Las Vegas, Nevada on September 25, 2004. The band visited the United States, Europe, and Mexico during the first four legs, before the final leg alternated with visits between the US and Canada. After the first four legs, the tour's itinerary was expanded for fairs, festivals, and casinos during the final leg, which was branded accordingly as a summer excursion. Although the tour provoked a variety of reactions from music critics, it was generally well received. Along with being one of the top-grossing North American tours of 2003 and 2004, Beer Drinkers and Hell Raisers sold over half-a-million tickets over its five legs. The band's compilation albums, Chrome, Smoke & BBQ and Rancho Texicano, were released during breaks in the tour, and most of their songs were incorporated into the main set. Critics held the Beer Drinkers and Hell Raisers Tour in high regard—in the Worcester Telegram & Gazette, Scott McLennan described the show as "a joyride".

Tour dates

See also
 Mescalero

References
Footnotes

ZZ Top concert tours
2003 concert tours
2004 concert tours